Thomas Arthur Joseph Southwell, 4th Viscount Southwell KP (6 April 1836 – 26 April 1878) was an Irish peer. He was the son of Lieutenant-Colonel Arthur Francis Southwell and Mary Anne Agnes Dillon. He joined the Army, but resigned after only three years. He became Viscount Southwell in 1860 on the death of his uncle Thomas Southwell, 3rd Viscount Southwell, whose heir apparent died without issue, and was appointed a Knight of the Order of St Patrick on 2 August 1871.

Lord Southwell married Charlotte Mary Barbara Mostyn, daughter of Sir Pyers Mostyn, 8th Bt. and the Hon. Frances Georgiana Fraser (youngest daughter of Thomas Fraser, 12th Lord Lovat). They had a son, who became the 5th Viscount, and a daughter, Frances, who married Major Herbert Stourton, a grandson of Charles Stourton, 19th Baron Stourton.

References

1836 births
1878 deaths
19th-century Irish people
Nobility from County Limerick
Knights of St Patrick
Lord-Lieutenants of Leitrim
Viscounts in the Peerage of Ireland